Al-Amiriya is a 16th-century madrasa (educational institution) located in Rada, Yemen.  It is under consideration for inscription as a UNESCO World Heritage Site. It was built in 1504 and is an example of the architecture of Tahirids, Yemen. The monument was in poor condition until 1978 when Iraqi-born archaeologist Selma Al-Radi saw it and enlisted financial help from foreign missions to restore it in a more than twenty-year effort which she led.

Significance 
This site was added to the UNESCO World Heritage Tentative List on July 8, 2002, in the Cultural category.

The restoration process revived the art of qadad, a form of waterproof interior and exterior plastering. In 2004 a documentary film, Qudad, Re-inventing a Tradition, was made on the subject by the filmmaker Caterina Borelli (preview).

The restoration of the Amiriya Complex was awarded the Aga Khan Award for Architecture in 2007.

See also
 More pictures of Amiriya Complex
 Qadad

References

Bibliography
 Al-Radi, S.; Barnes, R.; Al-Nasiri, Y.; Porter, V.; Hillenbrand, R. (1997). The 'Amiriya in Rada' : the history and restoration of a sixteenth-century madrasa in the Yemen. Title of Series: Oxford studies in Islamic art; 13. Oxford: Oxford University Press, for the Board of the Faculty of Oriental Studies, University of Oxford. 

Buildings and structures completed in 1504
Madrasas in Yemen
Educational institutions established in the 1500s